Zenger may refer to:
 
 Christoph Zenger (born 1940, Lindau), a German mathematician
 Erich Zenger (1939, Dollnstein - 2010, Münster), a German Roman Catholic priest and theologian
 John Peter Zenger (1697–1746), a German-American printer, publisher, editor, and journalist
 SS Peter Zenger, Liberty ship built in the United States during World War II, named after John Peter Zenger
  (born 1935, Herzogenaurach), German football player
  (1757, Straubing - 1827, Passau), German Catholic priest
 Karl Zenger (1873, Erding - 1912, Haar, Bavaria), a German figure skater
  (1838, Erolzheim - 1905), German architect
 Václav Karel Bedřich Zenger (1830–1908), Czech physicist and meteorologist
 Wilhelm Zenger (1877–1911), a German figure skater

References 

German-language surnames